Vairoalhi Ahves Sirrun is a Maldivian romantic drama television series developed for Television Maldives by Arifa Ibrahim. The series stars Niuma Mohamed, Lufshan Shakeeb and Ahmed Asim in pivotal roles.

Premise
Nadheem (Ahmed Asim), the only child of Naseer (Ali Shameel) and Wadheefa (Mariyam Shakeela), is secretly in love with his best-friend, Mariyam Shaanee (Niuma Mohamed), the indolent daughter of Seema (Aminath Rasheedha). While Nadheem's true feelings are concealed to Shaanee, she starts a romantic relationship with Shah (Lufshan Shakeeb), a cousin of Nadheem. However, things take an unfortunate turn when Seema reveals that Shaanee's father, on his dying bed, requested that Shaanee marries no one but Nadheem, which complicates her relationship with Shah.

Cast and characters

Main
 Niuma Mohamed as Mariyam Shaanee
 Lufshan Shakeeb as Shah
 Ahmed Asim as Ahmed Nadheem
 Ali Shameel as Naseer
 Aminath Rasheedha as Seema
 Mariyam Shakeela as Wadheefa

Recurring
 Ahmed Azmeel as Nahid; Shah's friend
 Khadheeja Ibrahim Didi as Thooba
 Aminath Shareef as Shah's mother
 Waleedha as Sithura Mohamed Wajeeh

Guest
 Mohamed Manik as Ibrahim; Thooba's friend
 Ali Azim as Shahid
 Fathimath Sama as a party guest
 Abdulla Munaz as a Doctor

Soundtrack

Accolades

References

Serial drama television series
Maldivian television shows
Films directed by Arifa Ibrahim